State College is a home rule municipality in Centre County in the Commonwealth of Pennsylvania.  It is a college town, dominated economically, culturally, and demographically by the presence of the University Park campus of Penn State University.

State College is the largest designated borough in Pennsylvania. It is the principal borough of the six municipalities that make up the State College area, the largest settlement in Centre County and one of the principal cities of the greater State College-DuBois Combined Statistical Area with a combined population of 236,577 as of the 2010 U.S. census. In the 2010 census, the borough population was 42,034 with approximately 105,000 living in the borough and the surrounding townships, often referred to locally as the Centre Region. Many of these Centre Region communities also carry a "State College, PA" address although they are not part of the borough. Happy Valley and Lion Country are also used to identify the State College area, including both the borough and townships of College, Harris, Patton, and Ferguson.

History
State College evolved from a village to a town to serve the needs of Pennsylvania State College, which was founded in 1855 as Farmers' High School of Pennsylvania. State College was incorporated as a borough on August 29, 1896, and it has grown with the college, which was renamed The Pennsylvania State University in 1953.

In 1973, State College adopted a home rule charter which took effect in 1976; since then, it has not been governed by the state's Borough Code, although it retains "Borough of State College" as its official name.

The university has a post office address in University Park, Pennsylvania. When it changed its name from Penn State College to Penn State University in 1953, its president, Milton S. Eisenhower, sought to persuade the town to change its name as well. A referendum failed to yield a majority for any of the choices proposed as a new name, so the town remains State College. After this, Penn State requested a new name for its on-campus post office in the HUB-Robeson Center from the U.S. Postal Service. The post office, which has since moved across an alley to the McAllister Building, is the official home of ZIP Code 16802 for University Park.

Geography

Location
It is surrounded by large tracts of farmland, and an expanse of Appalachian Mountain ranges and forests. Its location within a valley makes it prone to frequent rain and snowfall. Nittany Mountain is part of Pennsylvania's geologic ridge-and-valley province of the Appalachian Mountains. It is located at the approximate geographic center of Pennsylvania.

Neighborhoods
Two major sections in State College include the Downtown Improvement District and University Park. Some significant neighborhoods include Highlands, Orchard Park, West End, College Heights, Holmes Foster, South State College, Tusseyview, Greentree, Nittany Hills and Penfield, and Vallamont. Four of these neighborhoods, Orchard Park, Greentree, Tusseyview, and South State College, are included as one area called "Suburban State College" under the National Citizen's Survey.

Downtown

Downtown State College, also known as the Downtown Improvement District, is State College's commercial and cultural center. The area receives approximately 1.5 to 2 million annual visitors and boasts major festivals such as the Central Pennsylvania Festival for the Arts. Downtown State College has a population of 4,417 people.

Urban composition

State College is one of the densest cities in the U.S., primarily aided by the presence of numerous high-rises downtown along Beaver and College Avenues. The 2010s saw a construction boom downtown, with several mixed-use towers developed, including Rise, Metropolitan, Fraser Centre, and Here State College (a 15-floor tower on Garner Street), and others. Unlike older towers, many of the newer buildings are mixed-use, with retail on the ground floor, offices on the next couple floors up, and apartments on the top floors.

This high rise building boom has drawn debate in the local area. Some residents see it as a boon to increase foot traffic downtown and reduce congestion on the arterial roads leading into the town. Others, however, are skeptical of the developments since they replace historical buildings in the area at the expense, in their view, of the borough's character.

In 2022, the State College Borough Council repealed the zoning regulations in State College to deter dense housing developments. Critics of the change said that it would lead to urban sprawl and make housing less affordable, whereas proponents of the zoning change said that high-rise student housing was inconsistent with the character of the college town.

University Park

University Park is the largest Penn State campus and the postal address for the university. Notable sites include Old Main, a landmark of the Farmers' High School Historic District, Rec Hall, the Nittany Lion Shrine, the Palmer Museum of Art, Penn State Creamery, Beaver Stadium, and the Bryce Jordan Center; both Beaver Stadium and the Bryce Jordan Center are located in the university township half of University Park.

Highlands
From 1909 to 1932, the Highlands in State College were annexed. The area was acclaimed for its plots of land in proximity to the post office. Twenty mansions were built between 1925 and 1933 to attract fraternities, while smaller houses were also constructed. The neighborhood terminated around Irvin Avenue, but after World War II expansion was necessary to accommodate for returning soldiers. Today, the Highlands is the borough's most populous neighborhood with a population of 9,726 people, 77% of whom are in the age range of 18–24 years old. The neighborhood also includes a section of the Holmes–Foster–Highlands Historic District.

Orchard Park
Orchard Park is a multi-family residential area mostly populated by college-aged residents and young professionals. Expansion for the area began in the late 20th century with the population then about 4,000 people. The neighborhood is home to two parks and is adjacent to Westerly Parkway Plaza, which houses many businesses. Orchard Park houses the South Hills Business School, a YMCA, and the Cedar Heights Church, which is used as a location for voters in State College.

West End 
The West End, also referred to as Urban Village, is an extension of the Downtown and Holmes–Foster areas. Located adjacent to west campus, the West End has a high population of renters, representing approximately 96.3% of the population. The neighborhood had a population of 2,324 people as of the 2010 U.S. census. The West End also makes up a third of the Holmes–Foster–Highlands Historic District.

College Heights 

College Heights is a neighborhood and historic district north of campus. The College Heights Historic District was added to the National Register of Historic Places in 1995 and makes up the majority of the area. College Heights is dominated by families of professionals, other Penn State faculty, and Penn State students due to the area's proximity to the campus. From 1852 to 1920, the neighborhood included 15 homes just north of Penn State. Over the next decade, however, the number more than quadrupled to 69. Development continued throughout the 2010s with College Heights's population growing to 1,839 people. The neighborhood has a park that partly spills into Ferguson Township.

Holmes–Foster 
Holmes–Foster makes up half of the Holmes–Foster–Highlands Historic District, which was added to the National Register of Historic Places in 1995. Holmes–Foster had a population of 1,597 during the 2010 census.

South State College
South State College, also referred to as the South Neighborhood, is shaped by Easterly Parkway, University Drive, and Atherton Street, which form a triangular shape. The area began expanding around World War II and has a population of 1,313.

Tusseyview 
Tusseyview is located south of South State College and has a population of 995. The neighborhood has three parks: Tussey View Park, South Hills Park, and Nittany Village Park. The area is home to State College Friends School, a Quaker school that serves the local school districts.

Greentree 
Greentree is a neighborhood between Holmes–Foster to the north, Orchard Park to the south, and Ferguson Township to the west. The population was 923 people.

Nittany Hills and Penfield
Nittany Hills and Penfield are two sections of the same neighborhood. Nittany Hills includes the eastern half and Penfield makes up the western half. The neighborhood is sandwiched between State College South and College Township. The population was 353 people as of the 2010 census.

Vallamont
Vallamont is a small neighborhood east of the Highlands, west of College Township, and north of Nittany Hills. The population was 124 people as of the 2010 census. The number of residents is attributed to an apartment building located within the census borders.

Climate

State College has a humid continental climate (Köppen Dfa).

Weather in State College is strongly influenced by the mountain and valley topology of the area. The surrounding mountains cause significantly lower temperatures in the winter, and make summer heat waves much rarer than in the rest of the state. Precipitation is about 20% lower than areas at comparable elevations, again due to the surrounding mountains. Snowfall typically occurs between October and April, but has happened as late as June.

Demographics

According to the 2010 census, there were 42,034 people, 12,610 households, and 3,069 families residing in the borough. The population density was 9,258.6 people per square mile (3,574.3/km2). There were 13,007 housing units at an average density of 2,865.0 per square mile (1,106.0/km2). The racial makeup of the borough was 83.2% White, 3.8% Black or African American, 0.2% Native American, 9.8% Asian, 1.0% Other, and 2.0% from two or more races. 3.9% of the population were of Hispanic or Latino ancestry. 22,681 or 54.0% of borough residents were males and 19,353 or 46.0% were females.

A 2014 estimate had the racial makeup of the borough as 78.9% Non-Hispanic White, 5.6% Black or African American, 0.5% Native American and Alaska Native, 11.5% Asian, 0.1% Native Hawaiian and other Pacific Islander, 0.8% Some other race, and 2.2% two or more races. 4.4% were Hispanic or Latino (of any race).

Of the 12,610 households, 9.1% had children under the age of 18 living with them, 18.2% were married couples living together, 3.8% had a female householder with no husband present, 2.4% had a male householder with no wife present, and 75.6% were non-families. 33.6% of all households were made up of individuals, and 5.1% had someone living alone who was 65 years of age or older. The average household size was 2.30 and the average family size was 2.71.

The age distribution of the borough was overwhelmingly influenced by its student population: 5.1% of the population was under the age of 18, 70.6% from 18 to 24, 13.1% from 25 to 44, 6.5% from 45 to 64, and 4.7% was 65 years of age or older. The median age was 22 years.

The median income for a household in the borough was $23,513, and the median income for a family was $58,953. The per capita income for the borough was $13,336. 46.9% of the population and 9.8% of families were below the poverty line. Out of the total population, 10.6% of those under the age of 18 and 2.2% of those 65 and older were living below the poverty line. However, traditional measures of income and poverty can be very misleading when applied to a community like State College that is dominated by students.

The population of the State College metropolitan statistical area was 153,990 as of the 2010 U.S. census.

Economy

Pennsylvania State University is the largest single employer in the region, employing over 27,000 full- and part-time workers as of 2016. Other industries in the area include health care, retail, hospitality services, construction, and government.

Other notable employers include the Federal Government (452 employees), YMCA (446 employees), Wegmans (430 employees), Shaner Corporation (380 employees), McDonald's (263 employees), Giant Food Stores (255 employees), Hotel State College & Company (251 employees), Raytheon (251 employees), Sheetz (251 employees), Foxdale Village (250 employees), State College Borough Government (213 employees), Minitab (211 employees), and Penn State Hershey Medical Group (200 employees).

Arts and culture

Events

The Central Pennsylvania Festival of the Arts, usually referred to as "Arts Fest", is held downtown every July. The five-day festival features artists from around the country and draws more than 125,000 visitors. Streets are closed off and lined with booths where people can buy paintings, pottery, jewelry, and other hand-made goods. There borough hosts musical performances, plays, and food vendors selling everything from funnel cakes to Indian cuisine.

The Penn State IFC/Panhellenic Dance Marathon, commonly referred to as THON, is a 46-hour dance marathon that takes place every February on the University Park campus with the goal of raising money for the Four Diamonds Foundation. A number of events throughout the year pave the way to February's THON weekend.

Blue-White Football Weekend occurs in April and includes a carnival, fireworks, food vendors, a student entertainment stage, live music, a parade, and more. On game day, autograph sessions with the football student-athletes is held in Beaver Stadium prior to kickoff of the Blue-White football intra-squad scrimmage game.

Other annual events in the area include "First Night State College", a New Year's Eve celebration with carved ice sculptures and musical performances that takes place in downtown State College, and "Central PA 4th Fest", a day-long event that includes Fourth of July fireworks, crafts, food vendors, and entertainers.

On Saturday, February 4, 2017, State College set a Guinness World Record holder with Light Up State College organizing 5,226 lighted ice luminaries that were displayed across South Allen Street in Downtown State College.  This is the most ice luminaries in any one location to date.  The previous record was held by Vuollerim, Sweden, with 2,652 ice luminaries.

Sports

State College is most known for Penn State Nittany Lions football, which draws over 100,000 fans to Beaver Stadium on home games. The borough is home to the State College Spikes, a minor league baseball team that is part of the New York–Penn League and plays their home games at Medlar Field at Lubrano Park, and Penn State baseball.

Jeffrey Field
Jeffrey Field is a soccer stadium in State College that hosts the Penn State Nittany Lions women's soccer and Penn State Nittany Lions men's soccer teams. Address is University Drive at East Park Avenue.

Rec Hall
Rec Hall is a field house located on the University Park campus of the Pennsylvania State University. It was opened on January 15, 1929, and remains in use. It is home to the Penn State Nittany Lions women's and men's volleyball teams, and Penn State Nittany Lions wrestling. Rec Hall has a banked indoor track of approximately 257 yards around, or roughly 6.85 laps per mile.

Pegula Ice Arena 
Pegula Ice Arena is a 6,014-seat multi-purpose arena in University Park, on the campus of Penn State University, which opened October 11, 2013, to replace the 1,350-seat Penn State Ice Pavilion. The facility is located on the corner of Curtin Road and University Drive near the Bryce Jordan Center.

Beaver Stadium 
Beaver Stadium is an outdoor college football stadium in University Park, on the campus of Pennsylvania State University. It is home to the Penn State Nittany Lions, who have competed in the Big Ten Conference since 1960. Beaver Stadium has an official seating capacity of 106,572, making it the second largest stadium in the Western Hemisphere and fourth largest in the world as of 2022.

Rothrock State Forest 
The Nittany Mountain Biking Association (NMBA) is active at maintaining and adding trails throughout the local state forest. There are miles of trails through Rothrock State Forest for the purposes of mountain biking and hiking.

Government

Federal
At the federal level, State College is located in Pennsylvania's 15th congressional district, represented by Republican Glenn Thompson.

State
Republican Jake Corman represents Pennsylvania Senate, District 34, and Democrat Scott Conklin represents Pennsylvania House of Representatives, District 77.

County
At the county level, Centre County, Pennsylvania's county seat is in Bellefonte, Pennsylvania. There are three county-level district courts in the State College jurisdiction, Philipsburg, Bellefonte, and Centre Hall.

The current county-level districts are divided as follows, all of which are common pleas courts. The jurisdictions include civil claims and summary offenses. Higher level courts are located in neighboring Bellefonte.
 District 49-1-01, District Judge Carmine W. Prestia
 District 49-2-01, District Judge Casey McClain
 District 49-3-02, District Judge Kelley Gillette-Walker
 District 49-3-03, District Judge Allen Sinclair
 District 49-3-04, District Judge Thomas Jordan
 District 49-3-05, District Judge Steven F. Lachman

Regional
State College is a member of the Centre Region Council of Governments (CRCOG). Other members are
 College Township
 Ferguson Township
 Halfmoon Township
 Harris Township
 Patton Township

Local
At the local level, the State College government is currently run by the following elected officials:
 Mayor: Ezra Nanes
 President of Council: Jesse L. Barlow
 Council members:
 Jesse L. Barlow
 Deanna M. Behring
 Janet P. Engeman
 Gopal Balachandran
 Peter S. Marshall
 Nalini Krishnankutty
 Divine Lipscomb

Education

Public schools
State College is served by the State College Area School District, which operates nine elementary schools, two middle schools, and one high school in and around State College.

Charter schools
Centre Learning Community Charter School
 Nittany Valley Charter School
 State College Area Delta Program
 Wonderland Charter School
 Young Scholars of Central Pennsylvania Charter School

Private schools
 Children's House Montessori School
 The Goddard School
 Grace Prep High School
 Kinder Station
 Nittany Christian School
 Our Children's Center Montessori School
 Our Lady of Victory Catholic School
 Park Forest Montessori School
 St. John Catholic School
 Saint Joseph's Catholic Academy
 State College Friends School

Higher and post-secondary education
 Penn State University is located partially in the borough of State College.
 South Hills School of Business & Technology

Libraries
State College is served by the following libraries:
 American Philatelic Research Library
 Centre County Library & Historical Museum 
 Centre County Library Bookmobile
 Centre Hall Area Branch Library
 Holt Memorial Library (Philipsburg)
 Pennsylvania State University Libraries
 Davey Library (physical and mathematical sciences)
 Deike Library (earth and mineral sciences)
 Hammond Library (engineering)
 Pattee and Paterno Libraries (main library)
 Pollock Library (study library)
 Stuckeman Library (architecture and landscape architecture)
 Schlow Centre Region Library

Media
State College's daily newspaper is Centre Daily Times, part of the McClatchy Company newspaper chain. There is also a weekly version published as Centre Weekly.   Centre County Gazette is an alternative town newspaper, Newspapers of Pennsylvania State University's main campus include The Forum, the student-run Daily Collegian and Onward State is a student-run digital media blog.

Several magazines are published in State College, including State College Magazine,  Blue White Illustrated, Centered Magazine,  Pennsylvania Business Central, Provisions Magazine, Town & Gown Magazine, and Valley Magazine.

State College is part of the Johnstown/Altoona/State College television market, which is ranked as the 102nd largest in the nation as of 2016. Television stations broadcasting out of State College include WPSU 3 (PBS), WHVL-LD 29 (MyNetworkTV), and C-NET Centre County's government and education access television network, which broadcasts on two cable channels: CGTV (Government Access TV) on Comcast and Windstream Channel 7 and CETV (Educational Access TV) on Channel 98. WATM-TV 23 (ABC) produces a Centre County focused newscast, anchored from a studio on West College Avenue. WJAC-TV 6 (NBC), WTAJ-TV 10 (CBS), and WWCP-TV 8 (FOX) also maintain satellite studios and offices in State College.

Infrastructure

Transportation

State College is located at the junction of Interstate 99/U.S. Route 220 and U.S. Route 322. I-99/US 220 head north to an interchange with Interstate 80 and south towards Altoona. US 322 heads west along with I-99/US 220 and east towards Harrisburg. U.S. Route 322 Business passes east–west through State College on Atherton Street. Pennsylvania Route 26 passes north–south through State College, following the one-way pair of Beaver Avenue northbound and College Avenue southbound. Parking in the Downtown State College is regulated by on-street parking meters, two off-street parking lots, and four parking garages. The off-street parking lots offer parking with hourly rates, and the parking garages offer parking with both hourly rates and monthly permits. Parking in residential areas is regulated by residential parking permits, allowing holders of such permits to park beyond the posted time limits. Some streets near the downtown area allow holders of commuter parking permits to park beyond the posted time limits.

In 2009, the State College metropolitan statistical area (MSA) ranked as the tenth highest in the U.S. for percentage of commuters who walked to work (8 percent). In 2013, the State College MSA ranked as the fifteenth lowest in the United States for percentage of workers who commuted by private automobile (79.2 percent). During the same year, 9.9 percent of State College area commuters walked to work.

The borough is served by the Centre Area Transportation Authority for local bus service and the University Park Airport for commercial air traffic. Intercity bus service to New York City, Philadelphia, Pittsburgh, and other points across the state is provided by Fullington Trailways, Greyhound Lines, Megabus, and OurBus. State College Bus Station serves Fullington Trailways and Greyhound Lines and is located adjacent to downtown and the Penn State University campus. Megabus stops in the parking lot of the Walmart along North Atherton Street. State College does not have passenger train service; the nearest Amtrak stations located in Tyrone (approximately 26 miles away), Huntingdon (approximately 31 miles away) and Lewistown (approximately 32 miles away) serving Amtrak's Pennsylvanian train between Pittsburgh and New York City. Amtrak Thruway service is available via Fullington Trailways from State College to Pittsburgh.

Utilities
Electricity in State College is provided by West Penn Power, a subsidiary of FirstEnergy. Natural gas service in the borough is provided by Columbia Gas of Pennsylvania, a division of NiSource. The State College Borough Water Authority provides water service to State College and Patton, Ferguson, college, Harris, and Benner townships. Sewer service in State College is provided by the University Area Joint Authority. Trash and recycling collection is provided by the borough's Public Works department.

Health care
Mount Nittany Medical Center, which has 260 beds and offers emergency, medical, surgical, diagnostic, and community services, is located in State College.

Notable people
The following individuals were born and/or raised in State College:

Sport figures:
 Chris Bahr – former NFL placekicker and NASL soccer player
 Stan Belinda – former Major League Baseball pitcher
 Channing Crowder – former NFL linebacker, played six seasons with the Miami Dolphins
 Ron Dickerson Jr. – former head football coach at Gardner–Webb University, former NFL football player
 Ryan Gruhn –  martial artist and MMA coach
 Larry Johnson – NFL running back, most recently played for the Miami Dolphins
 Rob Krimmel – Saint Francis University men's basketball head coach 
 Butch Leitzinger – professional racecar driver
 Jordan Norwood – NFL wide receiver for the Denver Broncos, broke the super bowl record for longest punt return in 2016
 Barry Parkhill – former American Basketball Association shooting guard
 Bruce Parkhill – former men's basketball head coach
 Jay Paterno – author, former football coach
 Matt Rhule – football coach, currently head coach of the Nebraska Cornhuskers
 Jonathan Stupar – NFL tight end, most recently played for the Buffalo Bills
 Matt Suhey – former NFL fullback, played ten seasons with the Chicago Bears
 Myles Thomas (1897–1963) – former Major League Baseball pitcher
 Guard Young – gymnast, three-time member of the U.S. gymnastics team

Others:
 Michael Anesko – literary critic, author, and professor
 Kerry Benninghoff – member of the Pennsylvania House of Representatives
 Brian Blanchard – Judge of the Wisconsin Court of Appeals
 Galen Dreibelbis – real estate developer, former member of the Pennsylvania House of Representatives
 Ian Hendrickson-Smith – jazz saxophonist with Sharon Jones and the Dap-Kings and The Roots
 Si Kahn – singer-songwriter, political activist, founder of Grassroots Leadership
 Fraser Kershaw – activist and actor in Behind the Water
 Joshua Leonard – film actor, star of The Blair Witch Project and Madhouse
 Carol Mansell – television and film actress
 Caitlin Moeller – television and film actress
 Gretchen Morgenson – Pulitzer Prize-winning journalist for The New York Times
 Charles Myers (1913–2000) – former labor economist, author, and professor
 Vance Packard (1914–1996) – former journalist, social critic, and author
 Kelly Perine – television actor and comedian
 Adam Ragusea – YouTuber who creates videos about food 
 Arron Scott – dancer, member of the American Ballet Theatre corps de ballet
 Tom Shear – industrial/EBM musician, founder of Assemblage 23
 Doug Sweetland – animator for Pixar and Sony Pictures Animation
 John Taylor – lead guitarist and musical director for the Jonas Brothers
 Mary Louisa Willard (1898–1993) – former professor of chemistry at Penn State

The following were/are residents of State College:

Sport figures:
 Walter Bahr (1927–2018) – former professional soccer player, ASL and Penn State soccer coach; National Soccer Hall of Fame inductee
 Joe Bedenk (1897–1978) – former Penn State football and baseball head coach
 Pat Chambers – former Penn State men's basketball head coach
 George Daniel – champion fly fisherman, member of Fly Fishing TeamUSA
 Guy Gadowsky – Penn State men's hockey head coach, former IHL right wing hockey player
 David Kimball – former NFL and NFL Europe placekicker
 Jim O'Hora (1915–2005) – former football coach, associate professor at Penn State
 Joe Paterno (1926–2012) – former Penn State football head coach
 Russ Rose – Penn State volleyball coach and author
 Steve Suhey (1922–1977) – former NFL guard, played two seasons with the Pittsburgh Steelers

Others:
 Abhay Ashtekar – Professor of Physics at Penn State, noted for his contributions in general relativity and quantum gravity
 Rodney Erickson – former Penn State president
 A. William Hajjar (1917–2000) – former architect, designed several properties in the State College area
 Lloyd Huck (1922–2012) – former chairman of Merck & Co. and three-term Penn State trustees president
 Sarah Koenig – journalist, host and executive producer of the crime podcast Serial
 Thomas Larson (1928–2006) – former Federal Highway Administrator, Pennsylvania Secretary of Transportation, professor at Penn State
 Michael Mann – climatologist, geophysicist, director of the Earth System Science Center at Penn State
 James Morrow – science-fiction author
 Barry Myers – USCOA nominee, former CEO of AccuWeather
 Joel Myers – founder, CEO and chairman of AccuWeather
 Tawni O'Dell – novelist, author of Back Roads which was an Oprah's Book Club selection in 2000
 Sue Paterno – philanthropist, widow of Joe Paterno
 C. R. Rao – statistician and professor emeritus at Penn State
 Rustum Roy (1924–2010) – former professor at Penn State, founder of Materials Science Laboratory
 Henry Sahakian (1937–2021) – former businessman, founder of Uni-Mart
 Graham Spanier – former Penn State president
 Eric Walker (1910–1995) – former Penn State president
 Fred Waring (1900–1984) – former musician/bandleader and radio-television personality
 Bill Welch (1941–2009) – former mayor of State College

See also
 List of college towns

References

External links

 State College official website

 
1855 establishments in Pennsylvania
Academic enclaves
Home Rule Municipalities in Centre County, Pennsylvania
Home Rule Municipalities in Pennsylvania
Pennsylvania State University
Populated places established in 1855